Jean Michel Camille Malfroy (23 March 1839 – 6 January 1897) was a New Zealand engineer and local politician. He was born in Macornay, France on 23 March 1839.

Malfroy arrived in New Zealand via the Victorian goldfields in the 1860s. Naturalised on 7 May 1878, he was elected as the first Mayor of Ross on the West Coast of the South Island. He served as a Mining Engineer on the West Coast until appointment as Crown Lands Department Engineer in charge of works in Rotorua in 1886. He was a prominent local politician and developer of Rotorua tourist attractions. He also served as Head of New Zealand exhibit at the 1889 Exposition coloniale in Paris and was awarded the Chevalier of the Légion d’honneur by the French government on 30 October 1889. He died in Rotorua on 6 January 1897.

References

1839 births
1897 deaths
New Zealand engineers
French emigrants to New Zealand
Chevaliers of the Légion d'honneur
New Zealand recipients of the Légion d'honneur
19th-century New Zealand politicians
19th-century New Zealand engineers
People from the West Coast, New Zealand